The Wars series, also known as  and  is a series of military-themed turn-based strategy video games, usually developed by Intelligent Systems and published by Nintendo. The series debuted in Japan in August of 1988 with the original Famicom Wars, followed by sequels on the Super Famicom and Game Boy. These early installments were released exclusively in Japan, with Advance Wars (2001) being the first to reach the North American and European markets. Advance Wars was released in the United States on September 10, 2001, but put on hold in Japan and Europe due to the September 11 attacks. Although released in Europe in January 2002, neither Game Boy Advance game was released in Japan until the Game Boy Wars Advance 1+2 compilation, which released for the Game Boy Advance on November 25, 2004. The success of Advance Wars in the West is frequently credited as a driving force for Nintendo bringing another Intelligent Systems franchise, Fire Emblem, outside of Japan, as both series share a similar tactical gameplay style.

In 2005, Advance Wars: Dual Strike was released on the Nintendo DS family of systems, which followed and expanded on the basic format of its predecessors. That same year Battalion Wars, developed by Kuju Entertainment, was released for the GameCube in Japan under the title Totsugeki!! Famicom Wars, where it is considered a spin-off from the main series. Battalion Wars is a 3D action real-time strategy game, as opposed to the turn-based strategy of the main series. An expanded sequel for the Wii, Battalion Wars 2 was released two years later. The last major title in the franchise, Advance Wars: Days of Ruin, was released internationally for the DS in 2008 and notably departed from the series's lighthearted tone. Like the two Game Boy Advance titles preceding it, the game was canceled in Japan following a series of delays until it finally released as a downloadable game in 2013. At E3 2021, over a decade after the release of Days of Ruin, a collection of remakes of both Advance Wars games, titled Advance Wars 1+2: Re-Boot Camp, was announced for the Nintendo Switch, with a planned release date of December 2021. A release date of April 8, 2022 was later announced, however on March 9, 2022 it was announced that due to the 2022 Russian invasion of Ukraine the game was being delayed until further notice. Another release date of April 21, 2023 would be announced a year later. These remakes were developed in collaboration with WayForward Technologies.

Gameplay
The player takes the role of a Commanding Officer (CO) in an army, usually of a country called Red Star (changed to Orange Star following international releases). In the most recent title, Days of Ruin, it is replaced by a nation called Rubinelle (Laurentia in the European release). In the single-player campaign of the Advance Wars games, each level consists of a new map and opposing CO to defeat. Victory is achieved when all the opponent's units have been destroyed, their HQ is captured, or another victory condition has been met. COs take turns recruiting and commanding units on grid-based maps. Units available include infantry, tanks, artillery, bombers, and many other military units. Each turn, a unit may move around and/or perform an action, such as attacking or capturing a property. Certain actions, such as capturing, diving, or loading may only be performed at certain instances throughout the game.

The original Famicom Wars game consists of two armies, Red Star (which became Orange Star in later international versions, possibly to avoid associations with Communism) and Blue Moon fighting over square grid-based maps. The two armies could either be controlled by human players, or a human player could play against an AI opponent. The original Game Boy Wars games featured a system similar to Famicom Wars, except the grid was changed so that the grid squares acted more like hexagons; each square is adjacent to six other squares, instead of four. Game Boy Wars also features a different opposing army called White Moon. Otherwise, the rules remain identical, and only in Game Boy Wars 3 were unit levels and a new resource introduced. Super Famicom Wars, the sequel to Famicom Wars, introduced Yellow Comet and Green Earth, bringing the number of armies playable at once to four. It returned to the basic square grid-based map style of the original game.

The Advance Wars games introduced several new elements. The most notable is that COs now have special abilities called CO Powers that can affect the battle in different ways, giving the CO a temporary advantage over the other COs, such as providing allied units with increased firepower or causing damage to opposing units. Black Hole Rising introduced Super CO Powers, and Dual Strike introduced Tag CO Powers. Conditions such as fog of war, rain, and snow affect the abilities of units to reveal the map and move around. Days of Ruin removed many of the features added to previous Advance Wars games, greatly weakening CO Powers and reintroducing a unit level system.

Multiplayer
Multiplayer mode is an important part of the Nintendo Wars series. This allows players to compete against friends, each choosing a Commanding Officer to play and country to represent. The Advance Wars series of games, along with the far lesser known Game Boy Wars 3, include map editors, giving them increased replayability. In the original Famicom Wars, two players were allowed to play; in Game Boy Wars, players could play hotseat multiplayer games. Currently the only release to lack hotseat multiplayer is Game Boy Wars Turbo. The Advance Wars series on the Game Boy Advance allowed link-play using link cables. Online multiplayer was originally planned for Dual Strike, but was only later implemented in Days of Ruin.
Battalion Wars 2 introduced online multiplayer over the Wii's Wi-Fi connection. The game had 3 modes and 16 maps to play on. The multiplayer section was well-received but was criticized for not supporting voice chat.

Games

Notes

References

 
Intelligent Systems
War video games
Turn-based tactics video games by series
Nintendo franchises
Video game franchises introduced in 1988